Marat Voranaw (born 3 October 1988) is a Belarusian former professional footballer.

External links

1988 births
Living people
Belarusian footballers
Association football midfielders
FC Polotsk players
FC Vitebsk players
FC Orsha players
FC Slonim-2017 players